"Jaleo" is the first international and second US single from Ricky Martin's album Almas del Silencio (2003). It was released on May 2, 2003 internationally and in July 2003 in the United States. "Jaleo", a Spanish word of Hebrew origin, has various meanings: to clap or yell out words such as "¡olé!", "¡eso!" to encourage flamenco dancers during a performance, or a style of dancing. Billboard describes the song as an "uptempo track with Middle Eastern and flamenco inflections".

Music video
A music video, directed by Kacho López and Carlos Pérez, aired in May 2003.

Chart performance
"Jaleo" peaked at number one on the US Hot Latin Songs for one week and in Spain for four weeks. It was a top-forty hit around the world.

Awards
"Jaleo" (Roger Sanchez Remix) was nominated at the 2004 Latin Billboard Music Awards as the Latin Dance Club Play Track of the Year.

Formats and track listings

Canadian CD single / European mini CD single
"Jaleo" (Spanglish Version) – 3:41
"Jaleo" (Spanish Version) – 3:41

European CD single
"Jaleo" (Spanglish Version) – 3:41
"Jaleo" (Spanish Version) – 3:41
"Jaleo" (Pablo Flores Spanglish Radio Edit Remix) – 4:13

Australian/European CD maxi-single
"Jaleo" (Spanglish Version) – 3:41
"Jaleo" (Spanish Version) – 3:41
"Jaleo" (Pablo Flores Spanglish Radio Edit Remix) – 4:13
"Jaleo" (Roger Sanchez Spanglish Radio Edit Remix) – 3:08

European 12" single
"Jaleo" (Spanglish Version) – 3:41
"Jaleo" (Roger Sanchez Casa de Gitano Mix) (Spanglish) – 8:08
"Jaleo" (Jam Factory Oriental Remix) (Spanglish Extended Mix) – 4:47
"Jaleo" (Pablo Flores PF Dub) – 7:43

UK 12" promotional single
"Jaleo" (Roger Sanchez Casa de Gitano Mix) (Spanglish) – 8:08
"Jaleo" (Miracle Workz Remix) (Spanglish) – 4:19
"Jaleo" (Pablo Flores Spanish Club) – 8:22
"Jaleo" (Jam Factory Oriental Remix) (Spanish Extended Mix) – 4:47

US 12" promotional single
"Jaleo" (Roger Sanchez Casa de Gitano Mix) (Spanglish) – 8:08
"Jaleo" (Roger Sanchez Trizalismo Dub) (Spanglish) – 7:13

Charts

Weekly charts

Year-end charts

Release history

See also
List of number-one Billboard Hot Latin Tracks of 2003
List of number-one singles of 2003 (Spain)
List of Romanian Top 100 number ones of the 2000s

References

External links

2003 singles
2003 songs
Ricky Martin songs
Spanish-language songs
Macaronic songs
Number-one singles in Romania
Number-one singles in Spain
Sony Discos singles
Columbia Records singles
Songs written by Rayito
Songs written by Jodi Marr